Kushka ( Biriyani Rice) is a 2020 Indian Kannada-language drama film, directed and edited by Vikram Yoganand, produced by Prathap Reddy, Madhu Gowda and Kailash Pal under the banner of Smart Screen Productions and PM Productions. The film follows Heegondhu Dina (2018) and features writer and actor Guruprasad, along with Kailash Pal and Sanjana Anand. The director Yoganand is also credited as cinematographer. The songs are composed by Abhilash Gupta.

The film derives its name from the Khuska Rice, which is a popular dish from Southern India. It was theatrically released on 13 March 2020.

Movie inspired from Snatch, Delhi Belly, Hungama films. cryper crime comedy genre which is new in South Indian movies.

Cast

 Guruprasad 
 Kailash Pal 
 Chandu Gowda 
 Sanjana Anand
 Shobraj 
 Anil Kumar as Google Swamiji
 Madhuri Braganza 
 Arun Kumar.

Promotion and release

The official teaser was launched by Smart Screen Productions on 20 January 2020.

It was theatrically released on 13 March 2020.

Soundtrack 

The soundtrack composed by Abhilash Gupta and lyrics by Rahul Dit-O and Ramakrishna Ranagatti.

References

External links
 

2020s Kannada-language films
2020 films
Indian drama films
Films about food and drink
2020 drama films